Meilie District was a district of Sanming, Fujian province, People's Republic of China.

Administrative divisions
Subdistricts:
Liedong Subdistrict, Liexi Subdistrict, Xubi Subdistrict

Towns:
Chenda, Yangxi

References

County-level divisions of Fujian
Sanming